Chromatin assembly factor-1 (CAF-1) is a protein complex — including Chaf1a (p150),  Chaf1b (p60), and p48 subunits in humans, or Cac1, Cac2, and Cac3, respectively, in yeast— that assembles histone tetramers onto replicating DNA during the S phase of the cell cycle.

Function 
CAF-1 functions as a histone chaperone that mediates the first step in nucleosome formation by tetramerizing and depositing newly synthesized histone H3/H4 onto DNA rapidly behind replication forks.  H3 and H4 are synthesized in the cytoplasm. Several studies have shown that the interaction between CAF-1 and PCNA (proliferating cell nuclear antigen, which stabilizes CAF-1 at replication forks, is important for CAF-1's role in nucleosome assembly

The three subunits work together to make the complex function. The human subunit (p150) interacts with PCNA, which acts as a sliding clamp, to help the CAF-1 complex interact with the DNA replication fork. Additionally, p150 along with PCNA performs nucleotide excision repair to fix any damaged DNA. P60 interacts with ASF1a/b, which is a histone chaperone for H3/H4. p48 has roles outside of CAF-1, but when involved with the complex, it binds to H4.

p60 attracts ASF1a/b which is a chaperone for H3/H4 and this is in the complex with p150 which interacts with PCNA to attach to the replication fork. The CAF-1 complex adds the histones to the DNA ahead of the replication fork.

A mutation in p150 that results in a loss of function would lead to double stranded breaks, interruptions in the replication fork and translocations. In p60, loss of function would mean the histone chaperone for H3/H4 would not interact with the complex. A mutation like this in either subunit would result in loss of function for the CAF-1 complex as a whole. However, loss of function in p48 would alter how well the complex is able to chaperone chromatin, but would not stop it as a whole.

Roles 
CAF-1 is required for the spatial organization and epigenetic marking of heterochromatin domains in pluripotent embryonic cells, creating a cellular memory of somatic cell identity during cellular differentiation.

Cells resembling 2-cell-stage mouse embryos (totipotent cells) can be induced in vitro through downregulation of the chromatin-assembly activity of CAF-1 in embryonic stem cells.

CAF-1 forms a deadenylase complex with CCR4-Not, which should not be confused with the unrelated CCR4. The CAF-1/CCR4-Not complex cooperates with the release factor eRF3 and PABPC1 to shorten the poly(A) tail of mRNA during translation.

References

Further reading 

 

 
 
 
 
 

Molecular biology
Epigenetics
DNA replication
Induced stem cells
Gene expression